Sakthan Thampuran Nagar (S.T Nagar) is one of the business districts of Thrissur city in Kerala state, South India. It was named after King of the Cochin, Sakthan Thampuran, the very architect of Thrissur.

History
Two decades ago, the place which is now called Sakthan Thampuran Nagar was a vast paddy field. Due to the arrival of Pope John Paul II, the paddy field was converted to this form. Now it has become a major commercial hub in city. Later, after the departure of Pope John Paul II, then Thrissur District Collector Vinod Rai developed and built Shaktan Thampuran Private Bus Stand.

Important places
The second largest private bus station in Kerala is situated here. S.T Nagar houses several economic and government administrative and private companies' offices (mostly government offices like banks). Thrissur Municipal Corporation is planning set up a convention centre with a capacity to accommodate 2,000 persons at Sakthan Thampuran Nagar. The corporation would be setting up a decorated 'Town Square' at Sakthan Thampuran Nagar. A statue of Sakthan Thampuran, the ruler of the erstwhile princely State of Kochi who contributed immensely for the development of Thrissur, is erected at the 'Town Square'. 

 Shaktan Thampuran Private Bus Stand, Thrissur 
 South Indian Bank headquarters
 Trichur Heart Hospital
 Thrissur Vegetable Market
 Balya Children Hospital
 Thrissur City Traffic Police Headquarters
 Thrissur Police Club
 Thrissur Fire Force Station
 LIC Area Office
 Thrissur Fish Market

See also
Thrissur
Thrissur District

Suburbs of Thrissur city
Retail markets in India
Shopping districts and streets in India